Arthur Dillon (or comte Dillon) (1834, Paris - 1922) was a French cavalry officer and journalist, and friend of général Boulanger. He was the grandson of General Arthur Dillon (1750-1794), descended from a family of exiled Irish Jacobites.

He was secretary-general of the transatlantic cable company and a financier of Boulangisme.  His election as a deputy in 1889 was invalidated.  He and the Bonapartist Georges Thiébaud launched a vast journalistic campaign in Boulanger's favour.

Sources 

 Biographies Assemblée nationale (1889-1940) 

1834 births
1922 deaths
French people of Irish descent
Politicians from Paris
Members of the 5th Chamber of Deputies of the French Third Republic
French journalists
19th-century French military personnel
French male non-fiction writers